The Funiculaire du Havre (English: Funicular of Le Havre)  is a funicular railway line in the French port city of Le Havre.

The line is incorporated in the city's public transport network and operated by Bus Océane. It runs between Le Havre (Rue Gustave Flaubert) and the Côte Sainte-Marie (Rue Félix Faure) and includes a tunnel, a loop and a 41% incline.

The line was built and opened in 1890 by the Compagnie Générale Française de Tramways (CGFT). Until 1911, it was operated by unreliable steam coaches. In 1911, it was recabled and electrified.

See also 
 List of funicular railways

External links

Bus Océane
Structurae

.

Funicular railways in France
Railway lines opened in 1890
Standard gauge railways in France